Wintergarden is a shopping centre located in the city of Brisbane, Queensland, Australia. It was opened by the Premier of Queensland the Honourable Joh Bjelke-Petersen in 1982. It contains over 60 specialty stores over three levels. The centre was developed initially by the Kern Corporation Limited and constructed by subsidiary, Kern Construction and was the brainchild of the then MD, Mr. V.B. Paul; it was intended to create a retail focus to the Brisbane Commonwealth Games held in 1982.

History 
The location previously operated as the Wintergarden Theatre cinema complex from 1924 until it closed in 1973 and was demolished in 1981. The original building was designed by Ballantyne and Hare of Melbourne. Hall and Prentice in Brisbane provided local design assistance. The theatre featured a Wurlitzer pipe organ which could be raised and lowered from the orchestra pit. In 1929 the rival Regent Theatre opened also in Queen Street. With the transfer of ownership of the theatre to the Kern Corporation in the 1970s, and plans for the construction of the Queensland Performing Arts Centre at South Bank, the Her Majestys Theatre building next door to the Wintergarden was also marked for demolition and inclusion in the proposed new Wintergarden shopping centre.

Shopping precinct development 
The development beginning in the 1980s covered two stages, the first provided for three levels of retail and a two-storey carpark above. It boasted several national retailers previously unknown to Brisbane shoppers and the first CBD food courts covering a variety of cuisines. In 1987 the second stage was developed adjacent to Stage 1 and comprised additional specialty shops, a multi-cuisine sit-down restaurant (again, a first for the city and originally operated for 24-hours), and the Hilton Hotel which was intended to provide 5-star accommodation for the 1988 Brisbane World Expo. Hilton International Brisbane opened in October 1986.

In November 2009, it was announced that a $100 million refurbishment of Wintergarden would take place in two 12-month stages. The Wintergarden's facade was enhanced on all three street frontages. As part of the exterior works, the old skybridge linking the Wintergarden to the David Jones department store was removed. In addition, screens were placed above each entrance, which feature programmed LED lighting.

Redevelopment principal architect was The Buchan Group, and redevelopment façade architects were Studio 505. Redevelopment was completed in 2012.

Gallery

References

External links

Wintergarden Homepage
Wintergarden Upgrade
Wintergarden Targets Top End Fashion Stores

Shopping centres in Brisbane
Commercial buildings completed in 1982
Brisbane central business district
1982 establishments in Australia
Queen Street, Brisbane